Henry P. Jacobs (July 8, 1825 - December 14, 1899) was a janitor, preacher, founder of schools, and state legislator in Mississippi. He escaped slavery.

He was born in Alabama. He escaped slavery to Canada and then moved to Michigan before settling in Natchez, Mississippi after the American Civil War.

He founded the school that became Jackson State University. In 2010, Jackson State University president Ronald Mason Jr. proposed merging several Historically Black Colleges and Universities into specialized campuses of a newly formed university called Jacobs State University in honor of Jacobs.

He served with John R. Lynch and O. C. French in the Mississippi House of Representatives from Adams County, Mississippi.

In 2015 a mural was painted in Ypsilanti in his honor.

References

1825 births

1899 deaths

Members of the Mississippi House of Representatives
19th-century American educators
African-American state legislators in Mississippi
19th-century American politicians
Founders of schools in the United States
Politicians from Natchez, Mississippi
Fugitive American slaves that reached Canada
Jackson State University people
19th-century American slaves